Tell Me That It's Over is the second studio album by indie rock band Wallows, released on March 25, 2022, through Atlantic Records. The album followed their 2020 extended play, Remote.

Background 
On September 30, 2021, Wallows released the lead single, "I Don't Want to Talk", along with a music video and North American tour dates. On December 5, 2021, Wallows announced the album title and teased four snippets of audio tracks on a new website. The album's second single, "Especially You", and its music video were released on February 3, 2022. The track was released along with international tour dates, a tracklist, cover, and release date for Tell Me That It's Over. The third single, "At the End of the Day", was released on March 4, 2022. Along with it came a music video filmed in Las Vegas, Nevada. A music video for the fifth track on the album, "Marvelous", was released alongside the album on March 5, 2022. Filmmaker and photographer Jason Lester directed each music video released for Tell Me That It's Over.

Tell Me That It's Over was produced by band members Braeden Lemasters, Cole Preston, and Dylan Minnette, along with multi-Grammy winner Ariel Rechtshaid. Lemasters described the album to "American Songwriter" as “a result of the relationships we’ve had, and love, and being more of an adult, and what that means and the seriousness of it, versus the loss of innocence entering adulthood of our first album.”

Unlike with their debut album Nothing Happens, Tell Me That It’s Over came together over time with a return to some 2018 demos and some newer material. Wallows spent most of 2021 making the album.

The sixth track on the album, "Permanent Price", features vocals from Lydia Night, lead vocalist for The Regrettes and long-time girlfriend of Dylan Minnette.

Release and promotion 
Tell Me That It's Over was released through Atlantic Records on March 25, 2022, in vinyl, CD, digital streaming and download formats. To celebrate the album release, Wallows did a Q&A and a live performance at Rough Trade Records in New York City on March 26. On March 27, the band played Music Hall of Williamsburg. The performance was streamed live on Amazon Music's Twitch Channel. Finally, on March 30, Wallows performed "Marvelous" on Jimmy Kimmel Live! in support of their second album. Wallows announced the Tell Me That It's Over Tour in 2021. On April 1, 2022, Wallows played the first show of the tour at the Paramount Theatre in Seattle, WA. The band played 10 sold-out shows before taking a brief break. In that break, they performed at Coachella Valley Music and Arts Festival in Indio, California for the second time. Wallows resumed their tour on May 15 in Austin, TX. The band will be touring throughout 2022 and into 2023, with stops at festivals including Bonnaroo and Arts Music Festival, Lollapalooza, Reading Festival, and Leeds Festival. Special guests Spill Tab, Jordana, May-A, and Hatchie will be joining them on the road.

Track listing 
All tracks are produced by Ariel Rechtshaid, except where noted.

Notes
  indicates an additional producer

Personnel 
Wallows
 Dylan Minnette – vocals (1–6, 8–10), bass guitar (1, 3, 5, 7), whistle (1, 2), electric guitar (8), art direction, photography
 Braeden Lemasters – electric guitar (1–3, 5–8), vocals (2–5, 7–9), acoustic guitar (4, 6, 10), piano (5, 10), bass guitar (7), art direction
 Cole Preston – drums, piano (1, 10), electric guitar (2, 5–7, 10), vocals (2, 3, 7); drum programming, harmonica (2); synthesizer (4, 5), art direction

Additional musicians
 Ariel Rechtshaid – bass synthesizer (1, 3, 10), drum programming (1–4, 7, 9), string arrangement (1, 6, 7, 9), synthesizer (1–5, 7–10), bass guitar (2, 4–6, 8–10), percussion (2, 3, 5–7), harmonica (3), Rhodes solo (5), electric guitar (6–8), piano (6, 7), timpani (6), drums (8), Wurlitzer (10)
 Greg Leisz – banjo (3)
 Henry Solomon – saxophone (3, 5, 7)
 Roger Manning – synthesizer (4, 5), piano (6)
 Matt DiMona – keyboards (5)
 Danny Ferenbach – trumpet (5, 6), violin (6)
 Lydia Night – vocals (6)
 John DeBold – electric guitar (9)

Technical
 Emily Lazar – mastering
 Chris Allgood – mastering
 Dave Fridmann – mixing
 Jasmine Chen – engineering
 Matt DiMona – engineering
 Michael Fridmann – mixing assistance

Artwork
 Hernan Ayala – art direction, design
 Matthew Dillon – cover photo, sleeve photo
 Anthony Pham – back cover photo, poster design

Charts

References 

2022 albums
Wallows albums
Albums produced by Ariel Rechtshaid
Atlantic Records albums